The Spartan 7W Executive is a cabin monoplane aircraft that was produced by the Spartan Aircraft Company during the late 1930s and early 1940s. The 7W features an all-metal fuselage, as well as a retractable undercarriage. The 7W Executive was popular with affluent buyers worldwide.

Design and development
Designed expressly for the executive market, the Spartan Executive was configured for both performance and comfort. Built during the Great Depression, the 7W was the brainchild of company-founder William G. Skelly of Skelly Oil who desired a fast, comfortable aircraft to support his tastes and those of his rich oil-executive colleagues. Through a series of acquisitions, J. Paul Getty took over ownership of the Spartan Aircraft Company in 1935, and directed its fortunes from that point to 1968.

The interior of the 7W is spacious and features  of slide-back seat room for front-seat passengers, arm rests, ash trays, dome lighting, deep cushions, cabin heaters, ventilators, soundproofing, large windows, and interior access to the  capacity luggage compartment. The interior can be configured for four or five passengers.

The 10th airframe in the production run was modified into a military demonstrator, the Spartan 7W-F, incorporating two forward-firing .30 calibre machine guns mounted on the port side near the firewall and firing through the propeller arc through a synchronized mechanism. A further modification was to provide a gunner's station at a dorsal hatch on the roof with a windscreen and machine gun fitted. Provision was also made for bomb racks under the wings.

The military experiment was short-lived and the aircraft was reverted to a stock model and sold to aviatrix Arlene Davis who entered the Executive (NC17605) in the 1939 Bendix Air Races. Davis was the first woman to complete the race flying solo, and took the high-performance aircraft to fifth place.

Including the 7X prototypes, 36 7W Executives were built before production was halted in 1940. Following up on a modified Spartan Executive military demonstrator, a two-seat military variant of the 7W Executive, named the Spartan 8W Zeus, was developed. The aircraft featured a greenhouse canopy covering a tandem cockpit and was powered by a more powerful  Pratt & Whitney Wasp engine. A small production run of four or five examples was made but with no official interest, the project waned.

In 1942, a total of 16 7W Executives were impressed into military service with the United States Army Air Corps. The 7Ws served as executive transports for military staff as the UC-71.

A post-World War II effort to rekindle interest in the Executive series, under the re-branded Spartan 12-W designation, failed to gain interest. Only one Model 12 was completed, and today is part of the Tulsa Air and Space Museum & Planetarium collection.

In August 2018 a total of 17 model 7Ws were still registered with the Federal Aviation Administration in the United States.

Notable owners
Notable owners of 7Ws included aircraft designer and aviator Howard Hughes, wealthy industrialist J. Paul Getty,  and King Ghazi of Iraq. King Ghazi's Spartan Executive was designated "Eagle of Iraq" and was outfitted with his Coat of Arms, an extra-luxurious interior and customized features.

Variants
Spartan 7X Executive
 (also known as Standard Seven) The first prototype, fitted with a  Jacobs L-5 radial engine. One built - identifiable by the very small vertical tail.

Spartan 7W-P Executive
Second prototype, indistinguishable from 7W. Sole example exported to China in 1937.
Spartan 7W Executive
Production version powered by a  Pratt & Whitney Wasp SB radial engine. 34 built
Spartan 7W-F
A two-seat armed version with two fixed forward firing guns and one flexibly mounted machine gun in the rear cabin, as well as provision for 10 x 25lb bombs on wing racks. One built which was later converted to 7W Executive standard.
Spartan UC-71-SP
Spartan 7W Executives impressed by the US Army Air Corps.
Spartan 8W Zeus
Two-seat fighter version.
Spartan 12W Executive
Postwar tricycle gear-equipped variant.

Specifications (Spartan 7W Executive)

Military operators

 Royal Canadian Air Force
Three examples based in Montreal, formerly Royal Air Force examples used in California.

Chinese Nationalist Air Force
The second prototype was exported to China and serialed 1309. It was damaged beyond repair and captured by the Japanese who displayed it along with other captured Chinese aircraft.

Spanish Republican Air Force/Aviación Nacional
At least one example was received by the LAPE (Líneas Aéreas Postales Españolas) to be used as an airliner marked as EC-AGM until requisitioned by the Spanish Republican Air Force and marked as 30+74. It was later captured by the Nationalists. Several others were purchased by the Republicans.

Royal Air Force
One example (AX666) was built for King Ghazi of Iraq. Used by No. 1 Photographic Reconnaissance Unit RAF.
Three examples with serials KD100, KD101 and KD102 were used in California for flight training.

 United States Army Air Corps/United States Army Air Forces
16 examples impressed from civil owners. All but two survived to return to civil service.

See also

References

Notes

Citations

Bibliography

 Davisson, Budd. "Spartan Executive." Air Progress, March 1971.
 Donald, David. Encyclopedia of World Aircraft. Etobicoke, Ontario, Canada: Prospero Books;, 1997. .
 FAA Type Certificate Data Sheet TC628. Washington, D.C.: Federal Aviation Administration.
 Peek, Chet and George Goodhead. The Spartan Story. Norman, Oklahoma: Three Peaks Publishing, 1994. .
 Taylor, Michael J. H. Jane's Encyclopedia of Aviation. London: Studio Editions, 1989. .

External links

 Spartan on Aerofiles

1930s United States civil utility aircraft
Low-wing aircraft
Spartan Aircraft Company aircraft
Single-engined tractor aircraft
Aircraft first flown in 1936